The women's 5000 metres at the 2007 World Championships in Athletics was held at the Nagai Stadium on 29 August and 1 September.

Medalists

Schedule

Results

Heats
Qualification: First 5 in each heat (Q) and the next 5 fastest (q) advance to the final.

Final

References
General
Results
Results–World Athletics
Specific

5000 metres
5000 metres at the World Athletics Championships
2007 in women's athletics